Sarnath Banerjee (born 1972) is an Indian graphic novelist, artist, filmmaker and co-founder of the comics publishing house, Phantomville.

Biography
Banerjee was born in Calcutta and lives and works in Delhi, India. He studied image and communication at Goldsmiths College, University of London.

His first novel, Corridor (2004), published by Penguin Books, India, was commissioned as a part of a fellowship awarded by the MacArthur Foundation, Chicago and marketed as India's first graphic novel. However, River of Stories, a graphic novel by Orijit Sen published in 1994, actually holds this honor. His second novel, The Barn Owl's Wondrous Capers, was published in 2007.

Sarnath has also provided illustrations for novels by other authors. He designed the cover for Upamanyu Chatterjee's novel, Weight Loss.

Gallery of Losers
Sarnath's project, the Gallery of losers, was on display on billboards across the six Olympic Host Boroughs in East London. According to him, he came across the idea in São Paulo, Brazil, where he met 1984 Olympics silver medalist Douglas Vierra who almost won the judo gold that year. The Frieze Foundation has said that the work "taps into a collective consciousness of sporting near misses - the people who almost made it - and aims to resonate with both local communities and visitors to the London games".

Themes
Sarnath's graphic works often center on everyday Indian experiences. Often anecdotal and autobiographical in nature, they are imbued with a rich, distinctive sense of humor.  Banerjee describes himself as a recorder of a rapidly changing India. A theme that runs strongly in his work is the loss of architecture and history that comes with a developing country's reach for modernisation.

Bibliography

Graphic novels
Corridor (Penguin Books, 2004)
The Barn Owl's Wondrous Capers (Penguin Books, 2007)
The Harappa Files (HarperCollins, 2011, |)
All Quiet In Vikaspuri (HarperCollins, 2016, |)
Doab Dil (Penguin Books, 2019)

References

External links
Penguin Books page on Sarnath Banerjee
DVD with "Bengali Tourist" by Sarnath Banerjee
 Biography from the Berlin International Literature Festival

Interviews
New Images and Interview on SacredMediaCow
Sarnath says it best graphically , The Sunday Times, 17 January 2010
"The medium of comics allows you to have variable point of views playing around in a single space"- In conversation with Sarnath Banerjee on GraphicShelf

1972 births
Living people
Indian graphic novelists
Indian male novelists
Writers from Kolkata
21st-century Indian novelists
21st-century Indian male writers
Novelists from West Bengal